Fausto Santiago Cruz (born May 1, 1972) is a former Dominican Major League Baseball infielder.

References

1972 births
Algodoneros de Torreón players
Arizona League Athletics players
Detroit Tigers players
Dominican Republic expatriate baseball players in Canada
Dominican Republic expatriate baseball players in Mexico
Dominican Republic expatriate baseball players in the United States
Edmonton Trappers players
Guerreros de Oaxaca players
Huntsville Stars players

Leones de Yucatán players
Living people
Major League Baseball infielders
Major League Baseball players from the Dominican Republic
Mexican League baseball first basemen
Mexican League baseball left fielders
Mexican League baseball right fielders
Mexican League baseball shortstops
Mexican League baseball third basemen
Modesto A's players
Oakland Athletics players
People from Monte Cristi Province
Piratas de Campeche players
Reno Silver Sox players
Tacoma Tigers players
Toledo Mud Hens players
Vancouver Canadians players